Magnus Racing is an automobile racing team based in Tooele, Utah, USA, currently competing in the IMSA WeatherTech SportsCar Championship. The team was established in 2010 by John Potter and runs Acura NSX GT3 car in the series.

History
The team finished fifth in GT in its debut in the 2010 24 Hours of Daytona and was a regular competitor in the Rolex Sports Car Series season before making its American Le Mans Series debut at the season-ending Petit Le Mans, finishing third in the GTC class.

In 2011, Magnus competed in a full-season in the Rolex Sports Car Series and select races of the American Le Mans Series.

Magnus kbegan the 2012 Rolex Sports Car Series season with a GT class victory at the 2012 24 Hours of Daytona with drivers Andy Lally, Richard Lietz, René Rast and the team owner John Potter. It was the team's first victory.

Current drivers
Andy Lally
Marco Mapelli
John Potter
Spencer Pumpelly

Former drivers
Craig Stanton – 2010–2011

References

External links

American auto racing teams
WeatherTech SportsCar Championship teams

Audi in motorsport
American Le Mans Series teams
Auto racing teams established in 2010